Dorothy Ida Davies  (24 October 1899 – 11 July 1987) was a New Zealand pianist and piano teacher. She was born in Riverbank, Wanganui, New Zealand on 24 October 1899. She obtained her education at Wanganui Girls' College, and studied piano at the New South Wales State Conservatorium of Music in Sydney, and at the Royal College of Music in London, where she became an associate. She then had private tuition by Artur Schnabel

In early 1940, she married Reuel Anson Lochore. He became a diplomat with the Department of External Affairs and they lived in India from 1962, then Indonesia, and then West Germany (1966–1969), where he was New Zealand's first ambassador to Germany.

She was a member of Makara County Council in the 1950s, and acted as a justice of the peace. In the 1975 Queen's Birthday Honours, she was appointed a Member of the Order of the British Empire, for services to music.

Davies died at Whangaparaoa on 11 July 1987. Her husband died in 1991.

References

1899 births
1987 deaths
New Zealand educators
New Zealand pianists
New Zealand women pianists
People from Whanganui
20th-century New Zealand pianists
New Zealand Members of the Order of the British Empire
People educated at Whanganui Girls' College
New Zealand justices of the peace
Sydney Conservatorium of Music alumni
Local politicians in New Zealand
Women classical pianists
20th-century women pianists